Louis Colville Gray Clarke  (1881–1960) was an antiquarian, archaeologist, collector and curator.

He was Curator of the Museum of Archaeology and Anthropology, University of Cambridge from 1922 to 1937 and then Director of Fitzwilliam Museum from 1937 to 1946.  He was a fellow of Trinity Hall, Cambridge.

References

1881 births
1960 deaths
20th-century archaeologists
Alumni of Exeter College, Oxford
Alumni of the University of Cambridge
British archaeologists
Fellows of the Society of Antiquaries of London
Fellows of Trinity Hall, Cambridge
People associated with the Fitzwilliam Museum
People from Croydon